The President of Ireland has the right to appoint a maximum of seven members of the Council of State, which advises the President in exercising certain reserve powers. As well as the seven (or fewer) appointees, the Council has seven ex officio members and a variable number of life members by right of former office.  An appointed member's term ends when the President's term ends, although a new or re-elected President may re-appoint members. If an appointed member accedes to one of the positions conferring ex officio membership of the Council, this creates a vacancy which the President may fill via another appointment.

History
The first President, Douglas Hyde, who took office in 1938, did not nominate members till the Council first met in January 1940; all six nominees were Oireachtas members, and not members of the Fianna Fáil government party.

For long, Presidents included senior serving politicians on the Council. Éamon de Valera said during the 1937 debate on the proposed Constitution, "this Council of State ... will ordinarily contain the leaders of the big Parties in the Dáil." Upon Richard Mulcahy's 1971 death, de Valera invited Fine Gael leader Liam Cosgrave to join but Cosgrave declined. Fine Gael objected in 1991 that Mary Robinson had become the first President not to have the Leader of the Opposition in the Council. Robinson had promised to appoint two representatives of the Opposition, but the practice of including the Leader was not a fixed rule. In early 1995, after the Fianna Fáil-led government was replaced by a Fine Gael-led government without a general election, Mary Robinson asked Monica Barnes of Fine Gael to resign from the council of state to allow Mary O'Rourke of Fianna Fáil to be appointed instead to increase the Opposition voice. The Oireachtas Committee on the Constitution issued a 1998 report dealing with the Presidency, which recommended that the President be "empowered to nominate two members of the Dáil who belong to parties other than the party or parties that form the government for the life of that government".

Early Presidents included one or two representatives of minorities; there were several of Anglo-Irish, Protestant, or ex-Unionist backgrounds, and the Jewish Bob Briscoe. In campaigning in the 1990 presidential election, Mary Robinson promised to reform the Council of State. She criticised it for consisting "mainly of senior or retired politicians" and promised to make it "truly representative of the community as a whole". Prior to 1990, Presidents generally reappointed members from the previous term; new members were appointed only when a vacancy arose by a previous appointee's death or accession to ex-officio membership. Patrick Hillery considered new appointees upon assuming office in 1976, and was advised there was no precedent for informing former Councillors of their exclusion; Hillery decided "it would be too hurtful to drop any of the members".  Robinson abandoned this practice by appointing seven new members; Mary McAleese did likewise at both her first and second terms. Michael D. Higgins appointed six first-timers and Catherine McGuinness, who had served under Patrick Hillery. For his second term he appointed seven first-timers.

During the 2011 presidential election campaign, candidate Mary Davis, best known for her Special Olympics activism, pledged to nominate a person with intellectual disability to the Council. This proposal attracted some criticism as tokenism, but was endorsed by Fergus Finlay. During a debate on The Late Late Show, candidates were later asked whether they thought Denis O'Brien would be "a suitable person to be on the Council of State". After the victory of Labour Party candidate Michael D. Higgins, the party denied that its leader Eamon Gilmore had suggested nominees to Higgins.

List

See also
 Nominated members of Seanad Éireann, nominated by the Taoiseach

Sources

Citations

 
Council of State